is a former Japanese football player.

Playing career
Komatsubara was born in Gunma Prefecture on April 2, 1981. He joined the J1 League club Bellmare Hiratsuka (later Shonan Bellmare) youth team in 1998. On April 11, he debuted against Cerezo Osaka when he was 17 years old, which made him the youngest player who played in the J1 League. The club released many players due to their financial problems at the end of the 1998 season. In 1999, he played often and the club had many young players. However the club finished in last place in 1999 and was relegated to the J2 League in 2000. He also did not play as much in 2000. In 2002, he moved to Ventforet Kofu. However he did not play often and left the club at the end of the 2002 season. After one year, he joined his local club, the FC Horikoshi, in 2004. He retired at the end of the 2005 season.

Club statistics

References

External links 

1981 births
Living people
Association football people from Gunma Prefecture
Japanese footballers
J1 League players
J2 League players
Japan Football League players
Shonan Bellmare players
Ventforet Kofu players
Arte Takasaki players
Association football forwards